Christiane Tchotcho Akoua Ekué (born 1954) is a Togolese writer writing in French and a publisher.

Life
Ekué is the daughter of an accountant and a teacher, she was born in Lomé in 1954. Her family spoke Mina at home. She attended the school in Lomé where her mother was headmistress, going on to further studies in Beaune in France, in Togo and in Saarbrücken, Germany. After completing her schooling, she worked as a copy editor for the Togo publishing house Nouvelles Editions Africaines; in 1989 she wrote her first novel which tells the story of another novelist who has his manuscript stolen. In 1992, Ekué became assistant publisher and later became director for the company. In 2005, she created the publishing house Graines de Pensée in Lomé.

Selected works 
 Le Crime de la rue des notables, novel (1989)
 Partir en France, narrative (1996)

References 

1954 births
Living people
Togolese novelists
Publishers (people)
Togolese women writers
Togolese writers in French
20th-century Togolese women writers
20th-century Togolese writers
21st-century Togolese women writers
21st-century Togolese writers